Prithvi Vallabh (Hindi: पृथ्वी वल्लभ) is a historical drama Bollywood film directed by Sohrab Modi. Made under the Minerva Movietone banner it was released in 1943. The story is an adaptation of K. M. Munshi's book Prithivivallabh written in 1920. It had music by Rafiq Ghaznavi and Saraswati Devi with lyrics by Pandit Sudershan who also wrote the screenplay and dialogues. The film starred Sohrab Modi, Durga Khote, Sankatha Prasad, Kajjan, Meena Shorey, Sadiq Ali, K. N. Singh and Al Nasir.

The story revolves around two kings, Prithvi Vallabh (Munj) of Avantipur who is kind and just, and Tailap, a neighboring king who is cruel. With the help of his sister Mrinalvati (Durga Khote) and another neighbouring king Bhillam (K. N. Singh), Tailap manages to capture Prithvi Vallabh. The rest of the film follows incidents following his captivity.

Cast
 Sohrab Modi as Munj
 Durga Khote as Mrinalvati
 Sankatha Prasad as Tailap
 K. N. Singh as Bhillam
 Kajjan
 Meena Shorey as Vilas
 Amirbai Karnataki as Charini, the devotee
 Sadiq Ali as Kavi
 Al Nasir as Bhoj, Munj's son

Crew
 Director: Sohrab Modi
 Producer: Minerva Movietone
 Writer: K. M. Munshi
 Screenplay, Dialogues: Pandit Sudarshan
 Cinematographer: Y. D. Sarpotdar
 Audiographer: Keki Edulji
 Art Direction and settings: Rusi K. Banker
 Studio: Minerva Movietone
 Music: Rafiq Ghaznavi and Saraswati Devi
 Music Effects: Mir Sahib
 Lyricist: Pandit Sudarshan
 Choreographer: Chaubey, K. M. Parwar 
 Costumes: G. J. More
 Make-up: M. N. Borkar

References

External links
 
 Full movie on YouTube

1943 films
1940s Hindi-language films
Films based on Indian novels
Films directed by Sohrab Modi
Indian historical drama films
History of India on film
1940s historical drama films
Indian black-and-white films
1943 drama films